The Beijing–Baotou railway or Jingbao railway is an  railway from Beijing to Baotou, Inner Mongolia, functioning as an important route in North China. It was the first railway in China designed and built by Chinese. It passes through a famous section of the Great Wall at Badaling. It is now largely paralleled with Beijing–Zhangjiakou intercity railway and Zhangjiakou–Hohhot high-speed railway.

In 2019, with the opening of the Beijing–Zhangjiakou intercity railway, the Beijing–Baotou railway adjusted the mileage. The ordinary-speed line from Changping to Shahe was merged into the Shuangqiao–Shahe Railway (Beijing Northeast Ring railway). The actual starting point of the Beijing–Baotou railway was shortened to the south side of Changping, the section from Changping to Beijing North is considered part of Beijing–Zhangjiakou intercity railway.

History
The first section of the Beijing–Baotou railway, the Imperial Peking–Kalgan railway (now the "Jingzhang" railway) was constructed between 1905 and 1909, connecting Beijing with Zhangjiakou (Kalgan). This section was the first railway designed and built by Chinese. The chief engineer is Zhan Tianyou. He overcame the steep gradient near Badaling using a switchback. Due to his achievement in constructing this railway, Zhan (Jeme) is called the father of China's railways.

The railway was extended from Zhangjiakou to Hohhot by 1921 and to Baotou by 1923.

Even with the switchback, the gradient near Qinglongqiao railway station is still at 3.3%. In addition, travelling through the switchback is slow. This route was considered but dropped by Zhan due to high construction cost. Before the 1990s, the Fengsha railway was mainly used to transport freight, and the original Jingzhang railway was focused on passenger transport. Now, trains to/from Baotou have changed to use the Fengsha railway instead.

The Beijing–Zhangjiakou intercity railway and the Zhangjiakou–Hohhot high-speed railway, which both opened on 30 December 2019, parallel most of the line.

To improve the freight capacity of Tangshan–Hohhot railway, those two railway lines exchange their main line between Hulu railway station and Taobuqi railway station in September 2020, separating the freight and passenger corridors. Meanwhile the section between Taigemu railway station and Baotou railway station was also assigned to Tangshan–Hohhot railway which has been renamed as Tangshan–Baotou railway.

Current operations
The main route that deviates via the Fengsha railway is a double-track, electrified line. It is now used by little traffic.

Line S2

The stops at Qinglongqiao are service stops, not advertised passenger stops and the doors remain closed.

From 2008 to 2016, the S2 services operated hourly from Beijing North to Yanqing and Shacheng. From 2016 to 2019, the S2 services operated hourly from Huangtudian to Yanqing and Shacheng. Since 1 December 2020 there have been five services between Huangtudian and Yanqing each way from Friday to Monday and on public holidays. On other days there are three services. These services are the only regular traffic on the unelectrified line east of Shacheng and are operated using diesel multiple units. The Kangzhuang–Yanqing railway was temporarily closed between March 30, 2020 and June 30, 2020.

Stations and mileage
Some of the following stations are now disused.

 Beijing North 
 Qinghuayuan (Closed)
 Qinghe
 Beijing (via Beijing Northeast Ring railway)
 Shahe (above routes belong to Beijing–Zhangjiakou intercity railway)
 Changping
 Nankou
 Dongyuan
 Juyongguan
 Sanpu
 Qinglongqiao
 Qinglongqiao West
 Badaling
 Xibozi
 Kangzhuang
 Donghuayuan
 Tumu
 Shacheng
 Xinbao'an
 Xibali
 Xiahuayuan
 Xinzhuangzi
 Xuanhua
 Shalingzi east
 Shalingzi
 Zhangjiakou
 Zhangjiakou South
 Zhangjiakou(old)
 Kongjiazhuang
 Wangyuzhuang
 Guoleizhuang
 Chaigoubu
 Xiwanbu
 Yongjiabao
 Xiaxiaobao
 Tianzhen
 Luowenzao
 Yanggao
 Wangguanrentun
 Julebao
 Zhoushizhuang
 Datong east
 Datong
 Gudian
 Gushan
 Baoziwan
 Wutaiwa
 Fengzhen
 Jiandi
 Xin'anzhuang
 Yongwangzhuang
 Hongshaba
 Suojiacun
 Tuguiwula
 Naji
 Suji
 Guyingpan
 Jining south
 Hulu
 Sanchakou
 Basumu
 Shibatai
 Hala
 Magaitu
 Gujiabao
 Zhuozishan
 Fushengzhuang
 Anju
 Sandaoying
 Mengguying
 Qixiaying
 Minzu
 Taobuqi
 Guojiaying
 Baita
 Nandian
 Hohhot
 Youyouban
 Taigemu
 Dalibao
 Bikeqi
 Chasuqi
 Songla
 Taosihao
 Sanbashu
 Meidaizhao
 Laozang
 Salaqi
 Gongjiban
 Dongxing
 Guchengwan
 Baotou east
 Wanshuiquan
 Baotou

Gallery

See also

 List of railways in China
 Rail transport in Inner Mongolia
 Rail transport in the People's Republic of China

References

Railway lines in China
Rail transport in Beijing
Rail transport in Hebei
Rail transport in Inner Mongolia
Railway lines opened in 1909